Members of the Legislative Council of Northern Rhodesia from 1948 until 1953 were elected on 14 August 1948. The first session of the newly elected council started on 10 November. There were ten elected members, eight appointed members and six ex officio members.

List of members

Elected members

Replacements

Nominated members

Replacements

Ex officio members

References

1948